Daer Water (and , northern Scotland ) is one of the streams located in the watershed region which surrounds the River Clyde in Scotland. The Daer Water flows through the Daer Reservoir which supplies water to the nearby towns of Lanarkshire.

Etymology
The origin of the river-name Daer may be identical to that of the River Dare in Glamorgan, Wales (see Aberdare), and derived from the Brittonic dār/derw, meaning "oaks, an oakwood" (Welsh dâr, derw). However, recorded forms of this river name leave this equation, proposed by Watson, in doubt.

References

Rivers of South Lanarkshire
River Clyde